Asya Danielle Branch (born May 5, 1998) is an American beauty pageant titleholder who was Miss USA 2020 and represented her country at Miss Universe 2020 where she placed Top 21.

Early life and education 
Branch was born on May 5, 1998, in Detroit, Michigan, to African American parents. She is the sixth child of eight siblings. Branch grew up in  Booneville, Mississippi, where she attended Booneville High School.

After graduating from high school, Branch moved to Oxford, Mississippi, to attend the University of Mississippi. She graduated from the School of Journalism and New Media with a degree in Integrated Marketing Communications with an emphasis in Public relations and a minor in General Business.

In May 2021, Branch represented United States at Miss Universe 2020, held in the Seminole Hard Rock Hotel and Casino in Hollywood, Florida. Out of 74 representatives, Branch placed in the Top 21.

Branch grew up as the child of an incarcerated parent, and now advocates for prison reform. In 2018, while she was Miss Mississippi, she was part of a criminal justice reform roundtable at the White House with Donald Trump and Jared Kushner. She also performed the national anthem at a rally for Donald Trump that same year.

Pageantry
As Miss Mississippi USA, Branch was awarded the opportunity to represent Mississippi at Miss USA 2020, becoming the first African-American woman to be crowned Miss Mississippi USA. Originally scheduled for the spring of 2020, the Miss USA 2020 competition was postponed due to the COVID-19 pandemic in the United States, and later held on November 9, 2020, at Graceland in Memphis, Tennessee. She competed in finals and reaching the semifinals in the state for the first time since 2010, where she was crowned by outgoing titleholder Cheslie Kryst. Following her win, Branch became the first woman from Mississippi to be crowned Miss USA. She represented the United States at the Miss Universe 2020 pageant.

Previously, Branch was crowned Miss Mississippi 2018 and went on to compete in Miss America 2019 where she was unplaced. During Miss America 2019, she placed second-runner up in the Quality of Life awards at the pageant.

On November 29, 2021, she ended her reign and crowned her successor Elle Smith of Kentucky as Miss USA 2021 at the Paradise Cove Theater of River Spirit Casino Resort in Tulsa, Oklahoma.

References

Living people
1998 births
American beauty pageant winners
Miss USA winners
Miss Universe 2020 contestants
People from Detroit
People from Booneville, Mississippi
African-American beauty pageant winners